Sydenham (commonly referred to as Sydenham Ward) is a central business district located in Kingston, Ontario, Canada. The Sydenham district for census purposes is bounded by Lake Ontario to the south and east, by Princess Street to the north and Barrie Street to the west. These boundaries do not coincide with the Sydenham Ward boundaries for city councillor elections as they include parts of the downtown main street.

The average family income for the area is $85,636  which is considerably higher than the city average. This is attributable to the neighbourhoods proximity to Queen's University. The Sydenham neighbourhood has a mix of business and retail uses on its east and north sides as it approaches Princess Street, which is Kingston's primary downtown business district. The majority of the neighbourhood however is a mix of permanent homes and rental accommodations for students. Many of Kingston's historic limestone structures can be found in the Sydenham neighbourhood.

The neighbourhood is home to Empire Life Financial's Canadian Headquarters at King & Johnson Streets and is one of Kingston's largest employers with 550 full-time employees.

Hotels
 Delta Hotel Kingston-Waterfront
 Holiday Inn Kingston-Waterfront
 Confederation Place Hotel (formerly Howard Johnson)
 Four Points by Sheraton Kingston
 Residence Inn by Marriott

Restaurants

 Aqua Terra
 Atomica
 Brandees
 Cambodian Village
 Casa Domenico
 Curry Original
 Foorno La Trattoria
 Frankie Pestos
 Le Chien Noir
 Lone Star
 Pan Chancho Cafe
 Chez Piggy
 Milestones Grill and Bar
 Olivea
 Raging Bull Chop House
 Sotto Sopra Ristorante
 Tir Nan Og
 White Mountain Ice Cream
 Woodenhead's

Notable attractions

 Frontenac County Court House
 Kingston City Hall
 Murney Tower
 Marine Museum of the Great Lakes
 Pump House Steam Museum
 Flora McDonald Confederation Basin
 Springer Market Square
 Tourism & Visitors Centre (old Grand Trunk Railway Station)
 Kingston Yacht Club 
 St. George's Cathedral
 St. Mary's Cathedral
 Kingston Main Post Office
 Musiikki Cafe, Live Music Venue, and Whiskey Bar
 Hotel Dieu Hospital
 Kingston Frontenac Public Library - Central Branch

Education
 Sydenham Public School
 Ecole Cathedrale

References 

___. "Chronology of Old Sydenham Ward, Kingston" unpublished report for the City of Kingston and Bray Heritage 2009.

Neighbourhoods in Kingston, Ontario
Central business districts in Canada